Consolación del Sur is a municipality and town in the Pinar del Río Province of Cuba. Also called the Athens of Vueltabajo, it was founded in 1690.

Geography
It is located in a major rice-growing area; tobacco is also cultivated as in much of the Pinar del Río Province.

Wards of the municipality include Villa I, Villa II, Pueblo Nuevo, Arroyo de Agua,  Crucero de Echevarría, El Canal, Entronque de Herradura,  Herradura, Entronque de Pilotos, Pilotos, Puerta de Golpe, and Alonso Rojas.

Demographics
In 2004, the municipality of Consolación del Sur had a population of 87,500.

Attractions
There are three churches in this town, one Roman Catholic parish (dedicated to "Nuestra Señora de la Candelaria", or Our Lady of the Purification) and two Protestant churches. The town has two parks; the Catholic church is near the central park. There is also the Consolación del Sur Municipal Museum.

Notable people
Willy Chirino (b. 1947), Cuban-American musician
Frank Delgado (b. 1960), musician
Juan Miranda (b. 1983), baseball player
Diosmely Peña (b. 1985), athlete

See also

 Municipalities of Cuba
 List of cities in Cuba

References

External links

 
Cities in Cuba
Populated places in Pinar del Río Province
1690s in Cuba
Populated places established in 1690
1690 establishments in the Spanish West Indies
1690s establishments in the Caribbean
17th-century establishments in Cuba